The F**k-It List is a 2020 coming of age film about a straight-laced high school senior whose involvement in a prank-related accident realigns his life, which is compounded when he creates a version of a bucket list about a life he wished he'd lived beyond chasing grades and college acceptances.

Plot 

Brett Blackmore's pushy parents are excitedly celebrating his acceptance into 7 out of 8 Ivy League schools (including bragging to their friends, the school, the local paper) with Harvard being the only one he is wait-listed for. When his friends—Nico (Karan Brar), Clint (Marcus Scribner), Les (Tristan Lake Leabu), and Stacy (Amanda Grace Benitez)—take him to break into the school to play a benign prank, they accidentally blow up one of the buildings. He is the only one identified from this and, as a result, he loses his acceptance.

After sharing a brief kiss with Kayla (interrupted by the brash Ted) he records a video ranting about being forced down a path he didn't choose, including a 'fuck-it list' of things he wishes he had done if he wasn't scared it would affect his future. He posts it to his friendship group but accidentally posts it publicly. The post goes viral on a small scale (1000+ views overnight). His parents scheme to get him accepted by Harvard, including making advances to their friend (Peter Facinelli) who is also a board member of Harvard.

Kayla appreciates Brett's list and says that she needs his help to start checking items off of the one she's made as a result. This involves smashing the expensive Mustang belonging to her mother's alcoholic and abusive boyfriend, which she says she never had the guts to do before Brett's post. The boyfriend spots them and they drive off and spend a cute day together, including discussion of their mutual lists and Brett's public performance of "Wild Thing" on Venice Beach. Kayla is signed to Ted's dad's modeling agency, where she will be working in Europe over the summer to afford school, but she has to entertain the annoying Ted as a result.

Kayla reveals she has nowhere to go after smashing the car, and Brett refuses to help her in service of getting 'back on track.' She storms off but does later post a good-luck message to him. His list continues to gain traction online in the meantime, which affects his meeting with the principal and results in his inability to graduate high school. His parents berate him and he drives off in his dad's car to the Rocks to meet his friends. They spread the word and a large number of other teenagers turn up to burn their school books together. The fire builds attention for the list and he is called by a PR representative (King Bach) to help him monetise it. The police turn up to reveal he could be considered as inciting crime.

The dean of Harvard calls Barry to say that she wants to offer him a place as an iconoclast and disruptor. Meanwhile, Kayla finally agrees to see Brett and they make up. Brett has to write an essay to gain entry to Harvard, but he seems uninspired by it. He drops in on his friends' graduation to learn that Kayla's mother's boyfriend pressed charges for smashing up his car. Upon learning from Les that Dee was previously a valedictorian, he turns his Harvard essay into a new rant about the education system and success, rejecting them. His mother opens up to him, apologizing for pushing him and saying that they are on board with his decisions. Brett hits 3 million followers and Harvard says they loved his essay, offering him a place. Shortly after Kayla is told that in order to work in the industry she will need to attend to rich clients, Brett arrives in Spain to persuade her to travel with him instead (after rejecting Harvard again) which she is happy to do—both subscribing to the 'fuck-it' attitude. Brett tells Kayla that he was offered a visiting professorship.

Brett's fuck-it list 

 Not playing the clarinet
 Getting a grade other than an A
 Punch his physical education teacher in the face
 Skip school
 To base jump (revised to bungee jumping)
 Take a road trip
 Drag race
 Ride a motorcycle
 Play the guitar (and jam out)
 Go on tour (start a band and go on tour on motorcycles, which they then drag race)
 Fall in love
 Kiss his crush since the fifth grade (Kayla Pierce)
 Have the balls to post the list

Cast 
Brett Blackmore: Eli Brown
Kayla Pierce: Madison Iseman
Jeffrey Blackmore (father): Jerry O'Connell
Kristen Blackmore (mother): Natalie Zea
Nico Gomes: Karan Brar
Clint: Marcus Scribner
Les: Tristan Lake Leabu

Production 
Production began in 2018 by Awesomeness Films. It was Michael Duggan's directorial debut though he had been writing and producing in the industry for several years.

Reception 
Inkoo Kang from The Hollywood Reporter criticised the film for being tone deaf and unrealistic.

References

External links 
 

2020 films
2020s English-language films